Laishram Bedashwor Singh (born 31 January 1998) is an Indian professional footballer who plays as a midfielder for TRAU in the I-League.

Career
Born in Manipur, to a Hindu Meitei Family.  Singh was with the AIFF Elite Academy before being part of a group of five players from the academy to train in France with Metz. On 18 May 2016, Singh, along with the other four players in France, signed with Chennaiyin of the Indian Super League. For the 2016 season, Singh was listed as a developmental player for Chennaiyin.

Minerva Punjab
After the Indian Super League season ended, Singh was loaned out to I-League side Minerva Punjab for the 2016–17 season. He made his professional debut for the club on 15 February 2017 against DSK Shivajians. He started the match and played 35 minutes before coming off.

Chennaiyin B
On 13 January 2018, Singh started for Chennaiyin B, Chennaiyin's reserve team, in the Don Bosco - Fr. McFerran Trophy All India Football Tournament against ICF. He scored the first goal for Chennaiyin B in their 1–0 victory.

TRAU
On 1 July 2019, Singh moved to TRAU.

International
Singh was scouted into the AIFF Elite Academy and India national youth teams in 2012.

Career statistics

References

1998 births
Living people
People from Manipur
Indian footballers
Chennaiyin FC players
RoundGlass Punjab FC players
Chennaiyin FC B players
TRAU FC players
Association football midfielders
Footballers from Manipur
I-League players
India youth international footballers
AIFF Elite Academy players
Indian Super League players